Anthems 1991–2008 is a compilation album released by Ministry of Sound in Australia and the UK and the first in a series. The three CD set features dance singles from the period of 1991–2007 (despite the "2008" in the title).

UK Series
Anthems 1991–2008 is the first in a series of albums released by the Ministry of Sound. The series is split into three mini-series, these are "Anthems", "Chilled" and "Ibiza". There is not an official name for the series, but is often called 'Anthems' after four albums in the series and the first mini-series.

Currently, there are eight different albums in the series. The artwork scheme follows the Fifteen Years release of 2006, which is sometimes seen as the pre-runner to Anthems 1991–2008. The Ibiza 1991–2009 album notably comes in a 3-CD digipack, rather than the larger fold-away digipacks (which are contained in slipcases) used for the other seven albums. The same album is overlooked when the series is being listed in the booklet for Anthems R&B. All copies of Chilled Acoustic feature a mistake in the artwork, where the top half of the Ministry of Sound logo used on the reverse side of the digipack; is upside-down.

2011 saw the year with the most releases in the series, with seven being released, four of these featuring 'Anthems' in the name. The last two Anthems albums of 2010, Anthems Disco and Anthems Electronic 80s, were released only a week between each other (8 November and 15 November respectively).

List of albums in the series
Anthems 1991–2008 (2007)
Chilled 1991–2008 (2008)
Anthems II 1991–2009 (2008)
Chilled II 1991–2009 (2009)
Ibiza 1991–2009 (2009)
One (2009)
Anthems Electronic 80s (2009)
Chilled Acoustic (2010)
Anthems R&B (2010)
Anthems Disco (2010)
Anthems Electronic 80s 2 (2010)
Anthems Hip-Hop (2011)
Anthems Indie (2011)
Chilled Afterhours (2011)
20 Years (2011)
Anthems R&B II (2011)
Anthems Alternative 80s (2011)
Anthems Collection (2011)
Anthems Hip-Hop 2 (2012)
Big Beat Anthems (2012)
Anthems 90s (2012)
Anthems Electronic 80s 3 (2012)
Anthems Hip-Hop 3 (2013)
Anthems Trance (2013)
Anthems Hip-Hop 4 (2014)
Anthems 90s 2 (2014)
Anthems House (2014)
Anthems Drum & Bass (2015)
Anthems Soul Classics (2016)
Anthems Acoustic (2016)
Anthems Electronic 90s (2019)

List of download exclusives in the series
Chilled Sessions (2008)
iDrum Minsistry of Sound Anthems (2008)—iPod game
iDrum Trance Anthems (2008)—iPod game

Australian Series
Like in the UK, Ministry of Sound Australia's Anthems series started with Anthems 1991–2008, but the series in Australia is considerably smaller and less popular compared to MoSA's Sessions and Annual series. Anthems 1991–2008 and Anthems Electronic 80's being the same version as what was released in the UK, however Anthems II in Australia did not include the 1991–2009 subtitle and focused more on Australian dance and dance tracks that were on the ARIA charts for overall and club songs. Rave Anthems 1990–1996 was released exclusively in Australia and focused on Rave, House and Hi-NRG dance subgenres.

List of albums in Australian Anthems series
Anthems: 1991–2008 (2008)
Rave Anthems: 1990-1996 (2009)
Anthems II (2009)
Anthems: Electronic 80's (2010)
Anthems: 30 Years of Hip Hop (2011)

Track listing
Disc 1
 Show Me Love – Robin S
 Passion – Gat Decor
 Make The World Go Round – Sandy B
 Nakasaki (I Need A Lover Tonight) – Ken Doh
 Break Of Dawn – Rhythm On The Loose
 Alex Party (Saturday Night Party) – Alex Party
 Two Can Play That Game – Brown, Bobby (1)
 Push The Feeling On – Nightcrawlers (1)
 Where Love Lives – Limerick, Alison
 Hideaway – De'Lacy
 One Night In Heaven – M People
 U Sure Do – Strike (3)
 Keep Warm – Jinny
 I Believe – Happy Clappers
 I Luv U Baby – The Original
 Key The Secret – Urban Cookie Collective
 Don't You Want Me – Felix
 Plastic Dreams – Jaydee (1)
 Higher State Of Consciousness – Wink, Josh
 Ebeneezer Goode – Shamen (1)
 Everybody In The Place – Prodigy (1)

Disc 2
 You Don't Know Me – Van Helden, Armand & Duane Harden
 Trouble With Me – Black Legend
 So In Love With You – Duke (3)
 Bomb – Gonzalez, Kenny 'Dope' & The Bucketheads
 Everybody Be Somebody – Ruffneck & Yavahn
 Who Keeps Changing Your Mind – South Street Player
 Spin Spin Sugar – Sneaker Pimps
 RipGroove – Double 99
 Dreaming – Ruff Driverz & Arrola
 It's Not Over Yet – Grace (2)
 Greece 2000 – Three Drives
 Salt Water – Chicane (2)
 God Is A DJ – Faithless
 Born Slippy – Underworld (1)
 Kernkraft 400 – Zombie Nation
 Time To Burn – Storm (4)
 Sandstorm -Darude
 Castles In The Sky – Ian Van Dahl
 Silence – Delerium & Sarah McLachlan
 Out Of The Blue – System F
 9pm (Til I Come) – ATB

Disc 3
 One More Time – Daft Punk
 Needin' You - David Morales Presents: The Face
 Get Get Down – Johnson, Paul (3)
 Sing It Back – Moloko
 Another Chance – Sanchez, Roger
 Praise You – Fatboy Slim
 Red Alert – Basement Jaxx
 Intro – Braxe, Alan & Fred Falke
 Touch Me – Da Silva, Rui & Cassandra
 Lovestory – Layo & Bushwacka
 Lazy – X-Press 2 & David Byrne
 At Night – Shakedown
 Love Generation – Bob Sinclar & Gary 'Nesta' Pine
 It Just Won't Do – Tim Deluxe
. American Dream – Jakatta
 Rapture – iiO (1)
 Put 'Em High – Stonebridge & Therese
 Call On Me – Prydz, Eric
 Loneliness – Tomcraft
 Satisfaction – Benassi, Benny & The Biz
 Put Your Hands Up For Detroit – Fedde Le Grand

2007 compilation albums
Big beat compilation albums
Dance music compilation albums
Electronica compilation albums
House music compilation albums
Ministry of Sound compilation albums
Trance compilation albums